Ruins is a 2004 Slovenian drama film directed by Janez Burger. It was selected as the Slovenian entry for the Best Foreign Language Film at the 78th Academy Awards, but it was not nominated.

Cast
 Darko Rundek as Herman
 Natasa Matjasec as Zana
 Matjaz Tribuson as Gregor
 Milan Stefe as Vojko
 Vesna Jevnikar as Marjana

See also
 List of submissions to the 78th Academy Awards for Best Foreign Language Film
 List of Slovenian submissions for the Academy Award for Best International Feature Film

References

External links
 

2004 films
2004 drama films
Slovenian drama films
Slovene-language films